This was the first edition of the event.

Patrick McEnroe and Jonathan Stark won in the final 6–4, 6–3, against Paul Annacone and Doug Flach.

Seeds

  Patrick McEnroe /  Jonathan Stark (champions)
  Richey Reneberg /  David Wheaton (quarterfinals)
  Mike Briggs /  Trevor Kronemann (quarterfinals)
  Pablo Albano /  Tomás Carbonell (first round)

Draw

Draw

External links
 Draw

Delray Beach Open
1993 ATP Tour